was a Japanese waka poet of the mid-Heian period. One of his poems was included in the Ogura Hyakunin Isshu. He produced a private collection.

Biography 
He was the eldest son of Fujiwara no Kintō and, on his mother's side, a grandson of Emperor Murakami.

He served director for military affairs before becoming middle councilor. He was well known as both a poet and a calligrapher.

Poetry 

The following poem by him was included as No. 64 in Fujiwara no Teika's Ogura Hyakunin Isshu:

References

Bibliography
 
McMillan, Peter. 2010 (1st ed. 2008). One Hundred Poets, One Poem Each. New York: Columbia University Press.
Suzuki Hideo, Yamaguchi Shin'ichi, Yoda Yasushi. 2009 (1st ed. 1997). Genshoku: Ogura Hyakunin Isshu. Tokyo: Bun'eidō.

External links

List of Fujiwara no Sadayori's poems in the International Research Center for Japanese Studies's online waka database.
Fujiwara no Sadayori on Kotobank.

11th century in Japan
11th-century Japanese poets
Hyakunin Isshu poets